GPCA may refer to: 
 General Purpose of California, a product development firm in the United States
 Government Polytechnic College Anantnag, Anantnag, Jammu and Kashmir, India
 Green Party of California, a California affiliate of the Green Party of the United States
 Gulf Petrochemicals and Chemicals Association, represents the downstream hydrocarbon industry in the Arab states of the Persian Gulf
 Generalized Principal Component Analysis; see Rene Vidal